Royal Consort Wonsun of the Gyeongju Gim clan or before called as Primary Lady Gyeongheung (경흥원주, 景興院主) was a Korean Royal Consort as the 8th wife of King Hyeonjong of Goryeo and the mother of Queen Gyeongseong.

Biography

Early life and background
She was born into the Gyeongju Gim clan as the daughter of Gim In-wi (김인위, 金因渭). Her sister would become Yi Ja-yeon (이자연)'s wife and the mother of the future Queen Inye, Consort Ingyeong, and Consort Injeol.

Palace life
Although she was unknown when she first entered the palace, she was initially honoured as Primary Lady Gyeongheung (경흥원주, 景興院主) and given the Gyeongheung Residence (경흥원, 景興院) as her manor. In 1024 (15th year reign of Hyeonjong of Goryeo), she was given a consort's royal title, Deok-Bi (덕비, 德妃; "Virtuous Consort"). Meanwhile, her father was given a royal government position and received 300 Sik-eup (식읍 300호).

With King Hyeonjong of Goryeo, she had one child, a daughter. Their daughter married her own half-brother, King Deokjong and was posthumously known as "Queen Gyeongseong" (경성왕후).

Funeral
Her death date was unrecorded in Goryeosa, the main surviving text on the Goryeo dynasty. In 1057 (11th year reign of King Munjong) however, Queen Wonmok recorded that it was said that Munjong and his ministers were discussed the deceased Queen Wonmok's funeral, alongside buried Lady Gim and Wonmok based on the example of Queen Munhwa, which Gim was presumed to die before 1055.

Even though her tomb is unknown, she was later known posthumously as Pure Consort Wonsun (원순숙비, 元順淑妃).

References

External links
Royal Consort Wonsun on Encykorea .
원순숙비 on Doosan Encyclopedia .

Year of birth unknown
Year of death unknown
Consorts of Hyeonjong of Goryeo
10th-century Korean women
11th-century Korean women